Andrzej Głowacki is a Polish, European philosopher, designer, graphic artist, professor  of Academy Of Fine Art in Cracow (where he directs The Third Studio of Interior Design), head of Chair of Commercial Art, Computer Graphics and New Media in University of Information, Technology and Management in Rzeszów, Poland, and a co-author of the nascent Center of Digital Arts and Techniques also in UITM, Rzeszów.

Scientific career 
He graduated from Faculty of Interior Design In Academy of Fine Art in Kraków, Poland. His doctoral thesis from 1985 showed groundbreaking approach to methodology of designing process treated as a creative act or even a peak experience rather than simple realization of an idea. Emotional aspect of creating and self-awareness of designer are equally important in this theory based on transpersonal psychology and existentialism. Though the theory was innovative it occurred to be too controversial for its times in Poland. It became a valuable source for curriculum, implemented and developed in The Third Studio of Interior Design since 1994.

He was Dean of Faculty of Interior Design from 1990 to 1993. As the first dean after 1989 he began process of reformation in Academy.

He focuses on teaching and designing tangible and virtual realities, real spaces and cyberspaces.

Knowledge transfer 

He was editor-in-chief of CyberEmpathy: Magazine of Visual Communication and New Media in Art Science Humanities Design and Technology (2011 - 2016), published by Marika Wato. The journal continued the transhumanistic research direction described for the first time in the book "From Empathy to Cyberspace" written by Andrzej Głowacki and published in 2009. Andrzej Głowacki was responsible for fourteen editions of the journal as an editor-in-chief:

Issue 1 / 2011 (1) Sketches from Virtual Reality
Issue 2 / 2011 (2) The Gilliam’s Atlas
Issue 1 / 2012 (3) Cyber Fields Forever
Issue 2 / 2012 (2) Cyber Sky
Issue 1 / 2013 (3) Soluble Fish
Issue 2 / 2013 (4) Contemporary Art in Public Space
Issue 3 / 2013 (5) Architecture for Human, Humanism for Architecture
Issue 4 / 2013 (6) The Code
Issue 5 / 2013 (7) Visual Strategies
Issue 1 / 2014 (8) Augmented Reality
Issue 2 /2014 (9) Cyber Art
Issue 1 / 2015 (10) Hyper Visions
Issue 2 /2015 (11) The Eco-existentialism Theories
Issue 1 / 2016 (11) The Archetypes of Cyber Space

Design 
He was one of the most popular Polish designers in the 1990s. He set up legendary, surrealistic Gallery Jo Design, which was located in Doubting Thomas's Corner in Cracow from 1992 to 1996. Popular Polish and foreign artists: actors, writers, journalists were its frequent guests.
Projects from the 1990s represent optimistic design, full of stylistic courage and fun crafts with form. Objects are unconventional and quite unrealistic but they do not lose their functionality. Furniture, lamps and glass projects are the most characteristic. Their finessed shapes and both funny and philosophic names had many admirers in Europe.

Inspirations 
Theoretical physics is his great passion and influences his artistic activities. He often compares it with mystical knowledge of old cultures. According to the needs of the future he teaches transhumanistic ideas and designing for cyberspace.

Exhibitions 
Exhibitions of drawing, painting, graphics, collage in Poland, Germany, Netherlands and France, ex:
Nijmeegs Museum – Commanderie van Sint Jan from 29/06 to 11/08 1985
Museum Oud Rijnsburg - from 22/10/1989 to 16/3/1990 - Kunst uit Oost- Europa
(Kunst uit Polen  - review in local press)

Books

Publications

Notes

References

External links 

The Third Studio of Interior Design
Chair of Commercial Art, Computer Graphics and New Media - Projects Gallery

Polish interior designers
Glass artists
Living people
Year of birth missing (living people)
21st-century Polish philosophers